Francis or Fran Matthews may refer to:

Francis Matthews (actor) (1927–2014), British actor
Francis P. Matthews (1887–1952), 49th United States Secretary of the Navy and the 8th Supreme Knight of the Knights of Columbus
Francis Matthews (British Army officer) (1903–1976), British Army general
Fran Matthews (1916–1999), baseball player

See also
Frank Matthews (disambiguation)